Mouse Embryonic Fibroblasts (MEFs) are a type of fibroblast prepared from mouse embryo. MEFs show a spindle shape when cultured in vitro, a typical feature of fibroblasts.
The MEF is a limited cell line. After several transmission, MEFs will senesce and finally die off. Nevertheless, researchers can use several strategies, like virus infection or repeated transmission to immortalize MEF cells, which can let MEFs grown indefinitely in spite of some changes in characters.

MEFs are widely used in life science researches, especially in stem cell biology.

Preparation and culture 
To prepare MEFs, pregnant female mice are needed. After killing the female mouse, the researcher should incise its stomach and then detach the embryo from the placenta in a biohazard hood. Then the liver and head should be taken out. Finally digest the remains by enzymes to obtain single isolated cells and culture the cells in a tissue culture dishes. MEF cells can be cultured in vitro in DMEM medium with 10% FBS. To transmit MEFs, researches should use trypsin to digest the cells (making them detach from the surface) and transmit 1/5 cells digested into a new dish.

Application in biology 
In 1962, George Todaro and Howard Green, two researchers in New York University, immortalized MEFs by repeated transmission. These cells developed into the commonly used cell line NIH 3T3.

MEFs treated by mitomycin or gamma rays (such treatment makes MEF stop mitosis) are widely used as feeder in embryonic stem cell culture because they can mimic the microenvironment in embryo.
In 2006, Shinya Yamanaka reprogrammed MEFs into iPSCs by introducing 4 factors, which is remarkable in the development of stem cell biology.

See also 
Fibroblast
Embryonic stem cell

References 

Rodent cell lines